Luis Palacios Rossini (8 October 1910−the 1970s) was a Chilean politician who served as minister of State during Jorge Alessandri's government (1958−1964).

Biography
Palacios studied at the Concepción Seminary, in the Biobío Region. Then, he moved to Santiago and joined the Líceo de Aplicación. Years later he obtained his BA in Laws.

Palacios worked in saltpeter offices in northern Chile. Then, in 1924, he joined the Caja Nacional de Ahorros. In that entity, Palacios started as an agent, then he was an inspector and ended up occupying the branch management both in the Caja and its successor, the Banco del Estado (since 1955), an institution created by the second government Carlos Ibáñez del Campo in 1953.

In September 1963, Palacios Rossini was appointed as Minister of Mining by the president Jorge Alessandri. He remained in office until the end of the government in November 1964.

References

Bibliography
 

1910 births
1970s deaths
Chilean politicians
University of Chile alumni
20th-century Chilean lawyers
Chilean Ministers of Mining